The Sony α NEX-5T is a mid-range rangefinder-styled digital mirrorless interchangeable lens camera announced by Sony on 27 August 2013.

See also
List of Sony E-mount cameras
Sony NEX-5
Sony NEX-7

References
http://www.dpreview.com/products/sony/slrs/sony_nex5t/specifications

NEX-5T
NEX-5T
Live-preview digital cameras
Cameras introduced in 2013